Tressé (Gallo: Tresei) is a former commune in the Ille-et-Vilaine department of Brittany in northwestern metropolitan France. On 1 January 2019, it was merged into the new commune Mesnil-Roc'h.

Population
Inhabitants of Tressé are called tresséens in French.

See also
 Communes of the Ille-et-Vilaine department

References

External links

 

Former communes of Ille-et-Vilaine